Magnesium laurate is a metal-organic compound with the chemical formula . The compound is classified as a metallic soap, i.e. a metal derivative of a fatty acid (lauric acid).

Physical properties
Soluble in water.

Uses
Magnesium laurate is used in the food industry as a binder, emulsifier, and anticaking agent.

References

Laurates
Magnesium compounds